Tarzan's Fight for Life is a 1958 Metrocolor action adventure film featuring Edgar Rice Burroughs' famous jungle hero Tarzan and starring Gordon Scott, Eve Brent, Rickie Sorensen, Jil Jarmyn, and Cheeta the chimpanzee. The film was directed by H. Bruce Humberstone. The picture was the second Tarzan film released in color, and the last to portray the ape man speaking broken English until Tarzan, the Ape Man (1981). The filming locations were in Africa and Hollywood, California.

Plot
Jungle medics Dr. Sturdy (Carl Benton Reid) and his daughter Anne (Jil Jarmyn) are opposed by witch doctor Futa (James Edwards) of the Nagasu tribe, who regards their work as a threat to his own livelihood. Futa incites the tribe to waylay Anne's fiance Dr. Ken Warwick (Harry Lauter), who is saved by Tarzan (Gordon Scott).

Later Tarzan and his adopted son Tartu (Rickie Sorensen) enlist the doctors' services on behalf of Jane (Eve Brent), suffering from appendicitis. Futa hypnotizes Moto (Nick Stewart), a native assistant of Sturdy, to murder Jane, but Tarzan thwarts the plot. Learning that the young Nagasu chief (Roy Glenn) is sick, Tarzan attempts to persuade them to let Sturdy treat them. Seizing his chance, Futa has the ape man taken captive and condemned to death.

To restore his own credentials, the witch doctor then undertakes to cure the chief himself, hedging his bets by having his henchman Ramo (Woody Strode) steal medicine from Sturdy. Unfortunately, Ramo purloins a poison by mistake. Freeing himself, Tarzan intervenes and prevents the administration of the poison to the chief; Futa then swallows it himself to demonstrate that there is no harm in it — and dies. Dr. Sturdy is consequently called in, successfully curing the chief.

Filming locations
Much of the movie was filmed in Africa but some scenes were filmed in Norther California, at Hat Creek, the Pit River and at Burney Falls.

Cast
 Gordon Scott as Tarzan
 Eve Brent as Jane
 Rickie Sorensen as Tartu, Tarzan's Adopted Son
 Jil Jarmyn as Ann Sturdy
 James Edwards as Futa
 Carl Benton Reid as Dr. Sturdy
 Harry Lauter as Dr. Ken Warwick
 Woody Strode as Ramo

Box office
According to MGM records the film made $720,000 in the US and Canada and $1,325,000 elsewhere, resulting in a profit of $348,000.

Legacy
The film was released to coincide with the 40th anniversary of the first Tarzan movie.  It was the last Tarzan film made by Sol Lesser who retired and handed over the franchise to Sy Weintraub.

Shortly after completing this film, Scott, Brent, and Sorensen would play the same roles in an attempt to launch a "Tarzan" television series. However, the extremely low-budget project failed to sell, and the three half-hour episodes were spliced into an ersatz feature, Tarzan and the Trappers, released to television in 1966.

Notes

External links
 
 
 
 
 Tarzan's Fight for Life entry on "Down Memory Lane with Tarzan (Gordon Scott)"
 Tarzan's Fight for Life entry on At-A-Glance Film Reviews
 ERBzine Silver Screen: Tarzan's Fight for Life

1958 films
1950s action adventure films
1950s fantasy adventure films
American action adventure films
American fantasy adventure films
American sequel films
Films scored by Ernest Gold
Films directed by H. Bruce Humberstone
Films shot in Africa
Films shot in Los Angeles
Medical-themed films
Metro-Goldwyn-Mayer films
Tarzan films
Films produced by Sol Lesser
1950s English-language films
1950s American films
Films about witch doctors